Daawais  a zone in Somali Region of Ethiopia.. Daawa is bordered on the south by Kenya, on the northwest by the Oromia Region, on the northeast by Liban. Towns in Daawa zone include Mubarak, Mooyale, Hudhet, Kedaduma and Lahey.

See also 

 List of zones of Ethiopia

References 

Somali Region
Zones of Ethiopia